Kendall Township is located in Kendall County, Illinois. As of the 2010 census, its population was 7,739 and it contained 2,875 housing units.

Kendall Township was named after the county, which was named after Amos Kendall, a powerful Democratic politician in the Andrew Jackson administration. Kendall later became a business partner of Samuel F.B. Morse, inventor of the Morse Code and the electric telegraph, and made his fortune with Morse.

Yorkville's division amongst Bristol and Kendall Townships mirrors the fact that, until the 1950s, The City of Yorkville was situated along the south bank of the Fox River, while the Village of Bristol was situated to the north.  When the communities consolidated to form the United City of Yorkville (16 Apr 1957), a small community in Bristol Township, named "Bristol Station", was allowed to become the new Bristol, Illinois (unincorporated).

Geography

Demographics

Government
The township is governed by an elected Town Board of a Supervisor and four Trustees.  The Township also has an elected Assessor, Clerk, and Highway Commissioner.
Kendall County has its main offices, courthouse, and central County Seat within Yorkville.
Kendall Township has published an informational website https://www.toi.org/township/kendall-county-kendall-township

References
 

Townships in Kendall County, Illinois
Townships in Illinois